Mehdi Jamel Labeyrie-Hafsi, known as Mehdi Labeyrie or Mehdi Hafsi (born February 23, 1978) is a former French-born Tunisian professional basketball player.

Professional career
During his pro club career, Hafsi played in the French Pro A League, the Spanish ACB League, and the European-wide secondary level EuroCup.

National team career
Hafsi played with the senior Tunisian national team at the 2012 Summer Olympics.

References

External links
EuroCup Profile
FIBA Profile
Basketball-Reference.com Profile
Spanish League Archive Profile 
French League Profile 
Eurobasket.com Profile

1978 births
Living people
AS Monaco Basket players
ASVEL Basket players
Basketball players at the 2012 Summer Olympics
Centers (basketball)
Centre Fédéral de Basket-ball players
Élan Béarnais players
ESSM Le Portel players
Expatriate basketball people in Monaco
French men's basketball players
Joventut Badalona players
JSA Bordeaux Basket players
Liga ACB players
Limoges CSP players
Montpellier Paillade Basket players
Olympic basketball players of Tunisia
Power forwards (basketball)
Tunisian men's basketball players